Evgeniya Rodina was the defending champion, but lost in the first round to Eri Hozumi.

Belinda Bencic won the title defeating Arantxa Rus 7–6(7–3), 6–1 in the final.

Seeds

Main draw

Finals

Top half

Bottom half

Qualifying

Seeds

Qualifiers

Qualifying draw

First qualifier

Second qualifier

Third qualifier

Fourth qualifier

References 
 Main draw
 Qualifying draw

OEC Taipei WTA Challenger - Singles
Taipei WTA Ladies Open